FK Chmel Blšany was a Czech football club based in the village of Blšany. The club played in the Czech First League between 1998 and 2006 and was the first professional club of goalkeeper Petr Čech. The club disbanded in 2016 after resigning from the 2016-17 regional championship (5th tier of the Czech Republic football league system).

The club was established as Sokol Blšany in 1946. The club played at the Městský Stadion with capacity of 2,300 seats. That meant that even with every citizen of Blšany village in the stand, there would be still about 1,500 free seats.

History
FK Chmel Blšany was founded in 1946 as Sokol Blšany. Only amateur football was played in Blšany for a long time. In 1988, the team managed to reach the division and three years later the third Czechoslovakian league. In 1993, FK Chmel Blšany (or Chmelaři as called by their fans) reached the second league and in 1998 the first. In the 1998–99 season, FK Blšany astonished the Czech Republic and achieved 6th place. In 2005–06, the team ended up last and were relegated to the second league. In 2006–07, their first season back in the 2. Liga, they finished eighth but were relegated to the third-tier ČFL due to not receiving a license from the league due to financial reasons. They finished last in the ČFL with just four wins in the 2007–08 season and were subsequently relegated for the third time in as many seasons. It did not get better in 2008–09 when, upon finishing 14th of 16 teams in Divize B of the Czech Fourth Division, they were relegated for the fourth time in a row, partially due to a three-point deduction due to financial concerns. In 2009–10 they finished third in the fifth-tier Ústí Region championship and avoided relegation for the first time since the 2004–05 season. At the end of the 2010–11 season, Blšany gained promotion back to the Czech Fourth Division.

Notable past players include Petr Čech (1999–2001), Jan Šimák (1996–2000), Jan Velkoborský (1999-2003), Jiří Němec (2002–2003), Daniel Kolář (2005), Patrik Gedeon (1995–2001 & 2007) and Štěpán Vachoušek (2001).

Historical names
 1946 – Sokol Blšany
 1985 – JZD Blšany
 1991 – SK Chmel Blšany
 1992 – FK Chmel Blšany

Managers
 František Plass (1988–92)
 František Cipro (1992–1994)
 Zdeněk Ščasný (1995)
 Miroslav Beránek (1996 – Dec 2001)
 Günter Bittengel (Dec 2001 – Oct 2003)
 Michal Bílek (Oct 2003 – Jun 2006)
 Přemysl Bičovský (Jun 2006 – 2007)
 Josef Němec (2009 – )

History in domestic competitions

 Seasons spent at Level 1 of the football league system: 8
 Seasons spent at Level 2 of the football league system: 6
 Seasons spent at Level 3 of the football league system: 1
 Seasons spent at Level 4 of the football league system: 1

Czech Republic

European record

Honours
Czech 2. Liga (second tier)
 Champions 1997–98

References

External links

Official website

 
Defunct football clubs in the Czech Republic
Association football clubs established in 1946
Association football clubs disestablished in 2016
Czech First League clubs
1946 establishments in Czechoslovakia
Louny District
2016 disestablishments in the Czech Republic